Diangokro (also spelled Diangobo) is a town in south-central Ivory Coast. It is a sub-prefecture of Dimbokro Department in N'Zi Region, Lacs District.

Diangokro was a commune until March 2012, when it became one of 1126 communes nationwide that were abolished.

In 2014, the population of the sub-prefecture of Diangokro was 10,451.

Villages
The 16 villages of the sub-prefecture of Diangokro and their population in 2014 are:

References

Sub-prefectures of N'Zi Region
Former communes of Ivory Coast